Shimonia oyiekeae is a moth in the family Cossidae. It is found in the Democratic Republic of the Congo, where it has been recorded from Lubumbashi and Kolwezi.

The wingspan is 37 mm. The forewings are light ochre with patches of dark ochre at the costal margin. There is a dark ochre discal spot in the centre of the median cell and a dark ocher oblique waved subterminal line. The hindwings are cream ochreous.

Etymology
The species is named in honour of Dr Helida Achieng Oyieke.

References

Natural History Museum Lepidoptera generic names catalog

Metarbelinae
Endemic fauna of the Democratic Republic of the Congo
Moths described in 2013